Mehmandust Rural District is in Kuraim District of Nir County, Ardabil province, Iran. At the census of 2006, its population was 3,341 in 744 households; there were 3,136 inhabitants in 912 households at the following census of 2011; and in the most recent census of 2016, the population of the rural district was 2,465 in 768 households. The largest of its 23 villages was Busjin, with 524 people.

References 

Nir County

Rural Districts of Ardabil Province

Populated places in Ardabil Province

Populated places in Nir County